Tryambaka may refer to:

 Shiva, a Hindu god also known by the epithet Tryambaka ("three-eyed")
 Trimbak, a city in Maharashtra, India
 Tryambaka-yajvan (1655-1750), a Sanskrit writer from the Thanjavur Maratha kingdom